Sirsyedan is a town located in the south-west of Bagh District, a district in Azad Kashmir, Pakistan.

Populated places in Bagh District